Atelectasis is the collapse or closure of a lung resulting in reduced or absent gas exchange.  It is usually unilateral, affecting part or all of one lung. It is a condition where the alveoli are deflated down to little or no volume, as distinct from pulmonary consolidation, in which they are filled with liquid. It is often called a collapsed lung, although that term may also refer to pneumothorax.

It is a very common finding in chest X-rays and other radiological studies, and may be caused by normal exhalation or by various medical conditions. Although frequently described as a collapse of lung tissue, atelectasis is not synonymous with a pneumothorax, which is a more specific condition that can cause atelectasis.  Acute atelectasis may occur as a post-operative complication or as a result of surfactant deficiency.  In premature babies, this leads to infant respiratory distress syndrome.

Signs and symptoms

May have no signs and symptoms or they may include:
 cough, but not prominent;
 chest pain (not common);
 breathing difficulty (fast and shallow);
 low oxygen saturation;
 pleural effusion (transudate type);
 cyanosis (late sign);
 increased heart rate.

It is a common misconception and pure speculation that atelectasis causes fever. A study of 100 post-op patients followed with serial chest X-rays and temperature measurements showed that the incidence of fever decreased as the incidence of atelectasis increased.  A recent review article summarizing the available published evidence on the association between atelectasis and post-op fever concluded that there is no clinical evidence supporting this speculation.

Causes
The most common cause is post-surgical atelectasis, characterized by splinting, i.e. restricted breathing after abdominal surgery. Atelectasis develops in 75–90% of people undergoing general anesthesia for a surgical procedure.

Another common cause is pulmonary tuberculosis. Smokers and the elderly are also at an increased risk. Outside of this context, atelectasis implies some blockage of a bronchiole or bronchus, which can be within the airway (foreign body, mucus plug), from the wall (tumor, usually squamous cell carcinoma) or compressing from the outside (tumor, lymph node, tubercle). Another cause is poor surfactant spreading during inspiration, causing the surface tension to be at its highest which tends to collapse smaller alveoli. Atelectasis may also occur during suction, as along with sputum, air is withdrawn from the lungs. There are several types of atelectasis according to their underlying mechanisms or the distribution of alveolar collapse; resorption, compression, microatelectasis and contraction atelectasis. Relaxation atelectasis (also called passive atelectasis) is when a pleural effusion or a pneumothorax disrupts the contact between the parietal and visceral pleurae.

Risk factors associated with increased likelihood of the development of atelectasis include: type of surgery (thoracic, cardiopulmonary surgeries), use of muscle relaxation, obesity, high oxygen, the lower lung segments.

Factors also associated with the development of atelectasis include: age, presence of chronic obstructive pulmonary disease or asthma, and type of anesthetic.

In the early 1950s, in UK aviation medicine, the condition acceleration atelectasis was given the name "Hunter lung" due to its prevalence in pilots of the transonic fighter jet, the Hawker Hunter, which used a 100% oxygen supply.

Diagnosis

Clinically significant atelectasis is generally visible on chest X-ray; findings can include lung opacification and/or loss of lung volume. Post-surgical atelectasis will be bibasal in pattern. Chest CT or bronchoscopy may be necessary if the cause of atelectasis is not clinically apparent. Direct signs of atelectasis include displacement of interlobar fissures and mobile structures within the thorax, overinflation of the unaffected ipsilateral lobe or contralateral lung, and opacification of the collapsed lobe. In addition to clinically significant findings on chest X-rays, patients may present with indirect signs and symptoms such as elevation of the diaphragm, shifting of the trachea, heart and mediastinum; displacement of the hilus and shifting granulomas.

Classification

Atelectasis may be an acute or chronic condition. In acute atelectasis, the lung has recently collapsed and is primarily notable only for airlessness. In chronic atelectasis, the affected area is often characterized by a complex mixture of airlessness, infection, widening of the bronchi (bronchiectasis), destruction, and scarring (fibrosis).

Absorption (resorption) atelectasis
The Earth's atmosphere is mainly composed of 78 vol. % nitrogen and 21 vol. % oxygen (+ 1 vol. % argon and traces of other gases). Since oxygen is exchanged at the alveoli-capillary membrane, nitrogen is a major component for the alveoli's state of inflation. If a large volume of nitrogen in the lungs is replaced with oxygen, the oxygen may subsequently be absorbed into the blood, reducing the volume of the alveoli, resulting in a form of alveolar collapse known as absorption atelectasis.

Compression (relaxation) atelectasis
It is usually associated with accumulation of blood, fluid, or air within the pleural cavity, which mechanically collapses the lung. This is a frequent occurrence with pleural effusion, caused by congestive heart failure (CHF). Leakage of air into the pleural cavity (pneumothorax) also leads to compression atelectasis.

Cicatrization (contraction) atelectasis
It occurs when either local or generalized fibrotic changes in the lung or pleura hamper expansion and increase elastic recoil during expiration. Causes include granulomatous disease, necrotising pneumonia and radiation fibrosis.

Chronic atelectasis
Chronic atelectasis may take one of two forms—middle lobe syndrome or rounded atelectasis.

Right middle lobe syndrome
In right middle lobe syndrome, the middle lobe of the right lung contracts, usually because of pressure on the bronchus from enlarged lymph glands and occasionally a tumor. The blocked, contracted lung may develop pneumonia that fails to resolve completely and leads to chronic inflammation, scarring, and bronchiectasis.

Patchy atelectasis
Is due to lack of surfactant, as occurs in hyaline membrane disease of newborn or acute (adult) respiratory distress syndrome (ARDS).

Rounded atelectasis
In rounded atelectasis (folded lung or Blesovsky syndrome), an outer portion of the lung slowly collapses as a result of scarring and shrinkage of the membrane layers covering the lungs (pleura), which would show as visceral pleural thickening and entrapment of lung tissue. This produces a rounded appearance on X-ray that doctors may mistake for a tumor. Rounded atelectasis is usually a complication of asbestos-induced disease of the pleura, but it may also result from other types of chronic scarring and thickening of the pleura.

Treatment
Treatment is directed at correcting the underlying cause. In atelectasis manifestations that result from the mucus plugging of the airways as seen in patients with cystic fibrosis and pneumonia, mucolytic agents such as acetylcysteine (NAC) is used. This nebulized treatment works by reducing mucous viscosity and elasticity by breaking disulfide bonds in mucoproteins within the mucus complex, thus facilitating mucus clearance. Post-surgical atelectasis is treated by physiotherapy, focusing on deep breathing and encouraging coughing. An incentive spirometer is often used as part of the breathing exercises.  Walking is also highly encouraged to improve lung inflation.  People with chest deformities or neurologic conditions that cause shallow breathing for long periods may benefit from mechanical devices that assist their breathing.

The primary treatment for acute massive atelectasis is correction of the underlying cause. A blockage that cannot be removed by coughing or by suctioning the airways often can be removed by bronchoscopy. Antibiotics are given for an infection. Chronic atelectasis is often treated with antibiotics because infection is almost inevitable. In certain cases, the affected part of the lung may be surgically removed when recurring or chronic infections become disabling or bleeding is significant. If a tumor is blocking the airway, relieving the obstruction by surgery, radiation therapy, chemotherapy, or laser therapy may prevent atelectasis from progressing and recurrent obstructive pneumonia from developing.

See also
 Alveolar capillary dysplasia, a very rare type of diffuse congenital disorder of the lung
 Flat-chested kitten syndrome or FCKS: atelectasis in neo-natal kittens
 Tympanic membrane atelectasis: Retraction of the ear drum into the middle ear can also be referred to as atelectasis.
 William Pasteur, pioneer pulmonologist

References

External links 

 
 Atelectasis at Merck Manual of Diagnosis and Therapy Professional Edition

Respiratory diseases
Respiratory therapy